Aalter is a railway station in Aalter, East Flanders, Belgium.  The station opened on 12 August 1838 on the Line 50A. The train services are operated by NMBS/SNCB.

The current building was built in 1984 by architect Jacques Devincke.

Train services
The station is served by the following services:

Intercity services (IC-03) Knokke/Blankenberge - Bruges - Gent - Brussels - Leuven - Genk
Intercity services (IC-23A) Bruges - Gent - Brussels - Brussels Airport (weekdays)
Local services (L-02) Zeebrugge - Bruges - Gent - Dendermonde - Mechelen (weekdays)
Local services (L-02) Zeebrugge - Bruges - Gent (weekends)

References

External links

Belgian Railways website for Aalter

Railway stations in Belgium
Railway stations in East Flanders
1838 establishments in Belgium
Aalter
Railway stations in Belgium opened in 1838